The Messenger is a statue by the English sculptor David Wynne, OBE of a horse and rider. It was installed in the town centre of Sutton in Greater London, England in 1981.

Appearance
The statue features a horse and nude young male rider, created in bronze with very dark patination. It is located directly outside the main entrance to Quadrant House (in the Quadrant), adjacent to Sutton railway station. The horse, with a slightly raised left leg, looks towards the station. The boy-rider, seated bareback, raises his left hand in the air above his head and his right hand to his mouth, as if calling out. It is fully life-size and mounted on a 7-foot plinth of marble and granite slabs. The total height is 150 inches.

Development
The statue was commissioned by the then Business Press International Ltd, and upkeep of the work now falls to Reed Business Information, who occupy Quadrant House. 
It was a major commission for Wynne, which took four years from his first idea and inspiration on receipt of the brief through roughing out, refining and foundry to the final unveiling and installation. The brief given to him by the company was to illustrate the fundamental business of the company, namely communication, but to convey the idea, rather than simply to represent the work of the company in a direct or very obvious way.

Wynne had to consider what actual form the sculpture would take to best capture the idea of communication. When inspiration came to him, it did so "like a flash of light, complete", as he put it:

As part of his preparation, Wynne visited Italy to see the Equestrian Statue of Marcus Aurelius in Rome and the Horses of Saint Mark in Venice.

In his introductory essay in the book The Messenger, Lucius Noël notes Wynne's dislike for statues where the horse is shown as merely the support for the rider. Noël notes the way that Wynne highlights the interrelationship between horse and rider in the work, as he did in his previous two horse and rider sculptures. While noting the greater reality in the work than its two equestrian predecessors, he stresses the strong symbolism in the work. He writes:

Noël notes how this analysis ties in with Wynne's wider views about animals, saying "We must share the Earth with the animals, who have as much right to it as we do. To find a way to live in peace with the animals is our duty.".

Location

The company had initially considered that the work should be installed high up, above the entrance lobby. However, Wynne advised against this, feeling that the distance created would militate against the engagement he wanted people to have with the work. It would be perceived as two-dimensional, depriving people of the full three-dimensions they would feel by walking around it.  So the statue was installed at ground level in front of the entrance to the building, enabling people to get close up to it.

Describing his thoughts moments before the unveiling, David Wynne wrote in his 1982 book The Messenger:

See also
 Sutton twin towns mural
 Sutton armillary
 Sutton Heritage Mosaic

References

External links

1981 sculptures
Equestrian statues in the United Kingdom
Statues in London
Sculptures of men in the United Kingdom
Sutton, London
Tourist attractions in the London Borough of Sutton
Outdoor sculptures in London